The principality of Liechtenstein encompasses most of the eastern half of the Rhine Valley, wedged between Austria and Switzerland. The majority of the country's population is found in the western half along the Rhine River.  Along with Uzbekistan, Liechtenstein is one of only two doubly landlocked countries in the world.

Statistics 
Geographic coordinates: 

Area: 160 km2 (land, 0 km2 water)

Land boundaries
total: 76 km
border countries: Austria 35 km, Switzerland 41 km

Lake
The only lake in Liechtenstein is the Gampriner Seele.

Land use
arable land: 21.88%
permanent crops: 0%
other: 78.12% (2011)

Terrain

Mostly mountainous (Alps) with Rhine Valley in western third

Natural resources:
Hydroelectric potential, arable land

Extreme points:

 North - river Rhine, Ruggell 
 South - summit of Mazorakopf/Falknishorn (2,452 m), Triesen 
 East - border post 28, above Nenzinger Himmel
 West - river Rhine, Balzers 
 highest - Vorder Grauspitz (2,599 m), Triesen 
 lowest - Bangserfeld (429 m), Ruggell

Climate 
Continental; cold, cloudy winters with frequent snow or rain; cool to moderately warm, cloudy, humid summers, great variety of microclimates based on elevation.

Environment - international agreements 
Party to:

Air Pollution,
Air Pollution-Persistent Organic Pollutants,
Air Pollution-Nitrogen Oxides,
Air Pollution-Sulphur 85, Air Pollution-Sulphur 94,
Air Pollution-Volatile Organic Compounds,
Biodiversity,
Climate Change,
Climate Change-Kyoto Protocol,
Desertification,
Endangered Species,
Hazardous Wastes,
Ozone Layer Protection,
Wetlands,

Signed, but not ratified:

Law of the Sea

References 
 
Lists of coordinates